DMI may refer to:

Organizations
 Danish Meteorological Institute
 Data Management Inc., a time-and-attendance software company
 Dead Man Incorporated, a predominantly white prison-gang formed in Maryland
 Development Media International, a non-governmental organization associated with Effective Altruism
 Dhulikhel Medical Institute, in Nepal
 Digital Management, Inc., a provider of mobile enterprise, intelligence, and cybersecurity solutions and services
 Digital Manga, Inc.
 Drum Major Institute, a non-profit American progressive think tank and community action group
 Dubai Media Incorporated, owned by the government of the Emirate of Dubai
 Dunder Mifflin, a fictional paper company on the American television show The Office

Science and technology 
 Deferred Maintenance Item, an aviation concept.
 Desktop Management Interface, a computer-software framework for managing components
 Digital Media Initiative, a cancelled technology project run by the BBC from 2008 to 2013
 Direct manipulation interface, a style of human-computer interaction
 Direct Media Interface, an interconnection between the CPU to the southbridge of Intel motherboards.
 Dry matter intake, an animal's feed intake excluding its water content
 Dzyaloshinskii-Moriya Interaction, an interaction between neighboring magnetic spins
 1,3-Dimethyl-2-imidazolidinone, in chemistry, an aprotic solvent

Other uses 
 Des Moines, Iowa
 Directorate of Military Intelligence (United Kingdom), a department of the British War Office until 1964
 Dominica, UNDP country code